Peptidyl-prolyl cis-trans isomerase-like 3 is an enzyme that in humans is encoded by the PPIL3 gene.

Function 

This gene encodes a member of the cyclophilin family. Cyclophilins catalyze the cis-trans isomerization of peptidylprolyl imide bonds in oligopeptides. They have been proposed to act either as catalysts or as molecular chaperones in protein-folding events. Transcript variants derived from alternative splicing and/or alternative polyadenylation exist; some of these variants encode different isoforms.

Model organisms 

Model organisms have been used in the study of PPIL3 function. A conditional knockout mouse line called Ppil3tm1b(EUCOMM)Wtsi was generated at the Wellcome Trust Sanger Institute. Male and female animals underwent a standardized phenotypic screen to determine the effects of deletion. Additional screens performed:  - In-depth immunological phenotyping

References

Further reading